The Athens Pirates was an amateur baseball club in Greece, playing in the Greek Baseball league. They use the 10,000 capacity Oylimpic Hellinikon Stadium for home games.

The club was founded in 1992 and played till 2014 when the baseball league was closed down by the government due to low number of active clubs.

References

External links
 Athens Pirates logo
 http://www.Oylimpicproperties.com.gr
 http://www.Baseballstats.com.eu

Baseball teams in Greece
Sports clubs in Athens